Hostile Waters is a British 1997 television film about the loss of the Soviet Navy's K-219, a Yankee I class nuclear ballistic missile sub. The film stars Rutger Hauer as the commander of K-219 and claims to be based on the true story, also described in the 1997 book of the same name. The film was produced by World Productions for the BBC and HBO, in association with Invision Productions and UFA Filmproduktions. It was written by Troy Kennedy Martin and directed by David Drury, and was first transmitted on BBC One on 26 July 1997.

Plot
In 1986, the Soviet Navy submarine K-219 performs a Crazy Ivan, and USS Aurora collides with her, causing a rupture of the seal on one of its ballistic missile tubes. The leaking seawater causes a corrosive reaction which floods the sub with toxic gas. The corrosive reaction starts a fire that floods the sub with more toxic gas, and smoke.

The captain surfaces the boat and moves the crew out to the deck, and attempts to vent the sub. The chief engineer informs the captain that the fire may cook off the nukes and cause a nuclear explosion. The launch doors are opened on the sub to vent smoke.

Aurora ascertains that a fire is aboard K-219, and informs the Pentagon. The Pentagon, fearing radiological contamination of the Eastern Seaboard, orders Aurora to prepare to sink K-219. The fact that the launch doors are open on the SLBMs causes consternation in Washington D.C., with calls for the immediate sinking of the sub, should it appear to be preparing to launch.

The captain of K-219 prepares a bold plan to dive with the launch doors open, to flood the missile bay and quench the fires. As the captain dives the sub, Aurora prepares to fire, assuming K-219 is setting about to launch its missiles. After a brief but heated argument the U.S. commander is convinced to wait before launching and realises that the Soviet sub is diving, rather than launching its SLBMs.

K-219'''s tactic works, and the sub resurfaces with the fires out. A new crisis develops: Both nuclear reactors are overheating, and the cooling rods must be lowered manually by two crew members who have only limited oxygen left. The rods are lowered, and both reactors are shut down, averting disaster, but one crew member remains locked inside the reactor room, running out of oxygen. With seawater flooding the submarine, the captain of K-219'' decides to abandon ship. Throughout the crisis, Washington insists that no information on the possibility of nuclear fallout along the eastern American coastline be leaked to the Governors and no evacuation plans be activated to protect the population, in order not to derail the forthcoming Reykjavik Summit between Soviet leader Mikhail Gorbachev and U.S. President Ronald Reagan.

Capt. Britanov and his surviving crew members return safely to Moscow with some crew decorated and he being dismissed from the navy. The Reykjavik Summit takes place as planned.

The film's postscript details that as a legacy almost a decade after the end of the Cold War, fifty one nuclear warheads and seven nuclear reactors from nuclear submarines litter the North Atlantic ocean floor.

Cast
 Rutger Hauer as Captain Igor Britanov
 Martin Sheen as Aurora Skipper
 Max von Sydow as Admiral Chernavin
 Colm Feore as Pshenishny
 Rob Campbell as Sergei Preminin
 Harris Yulin as Admiral Quinn
 Regina Taylor as Lieutenant Curtis
 John Rothman as Aurora Executive Officer
 Michael Attwell as Kuzmenko
 Dominic Monaghan as Sasha
 Peter Guinness as Vladimirov
 James E. Kerr as Aznabaev
 Alexis Denisof as John Baker
 Seamus McQuade as Helmsman
 Paul Birchard as Torpedo Chief
 Oliver Marlo as Doctor
 Mark Drewry as Petrachkov
 Denzil Kilvington as Volnigbirov
 Garry Cooper as Gennady
 Frank Baker as Pumps
 Richard Graham as Belikov
 Joachim Paul Assböck as Tigran Gasparian
 Alexander Wachholz as Martinov
 David King as Admiral 2nd Class
 Todd Boyce as Larry Brock
 Michael Shannon as Admiral
 Sanja Spengler as Britanov's Wife
 Philip Martin Brown as Cook
 J.J. Gordon as Officer 4
 Lawrence Elman as Officer
 Erik Hansen as Naval Marshall
 William Marsh as Acoustics Officer
 Rainer Sellien as Technician
 Norbert Tefelski as Admiral / Engineer
 Felix zu Knyphausen as Sonar Operator
 Frank Witter as Russian Submarine Soldier (uncredited)

External links 

1997 television films
1997 films
Cold War submarine films
Films about survivors of seafaring accidents or incidents
HBO Films films
Films shot at Pinewood Studios
Seafaring films based on actual events
Science docudramas
Films set in 1986
British docudrama films
Military of Russia in films
Films set in the Atlantic Ocean
1990s British films
British drama television films